George Epps may refer to:

 George Epps (actuary) (1885–1951), British actuary and civil servant
 George Napoleon Epps (1815–1874), homeopathic practitioner and author